Guram Shengelia (born October 10, 1992) is a Georgian rugby union player. His position is flanker, and he currently plays for Jiki Gori in the Didi 10 and the Georgia national rugby union team.

References

1992 births
Living people
Rugby union players from Georgia (country)
Georgia international rugby union players
Rugby union flankers